Jean-Pierre Maransin (20 March 1770 in Lourdes – 15 May 1828 in Paris) was a Général de Division of the First French Empire who saw action during the Peninsular War.  He was made Colonel of the 1st Legion du Midi on 27 January 1807 and promoted to Général de Brigade on 8 November 1808.  He fought at the Battle of Albuera on 16 May 1811.  Maransin's final promotion to the rank of Général de Division occurred on 20 May 1813, and he was named Commander of the Légion d’Honneur on 15 December 1814.

Career
Maransin participated in Andoche Junot's invasion of Portugal and was stationed in the southern province of Algarve when the revolt against French occupation broke out. When his bedridden commanding officer Antoine Maurin was captured by the Portuguese, Maransin gathered up the troops in the province. These 1,200 men included the Legion du Midi and one battalion of the 26th Line Infantry Regiment. He successfully withdrew to Lisbon via Mértola and Beja.

Notes

References 

1770 births
1828 deaths
French commanders of the Napoleonic Wars
People from Lourdes
Burials at Père Lachaise Cemetery
Names inscribed under the Arc de Triomphe